Ngaio Bealum is an American comedian, musician, writer, actor, activist, juggler and publisher.  He co-hosted Cannabis Planet and published West Coast Cannabis Magazine. Bealum hosted a podcast on Cannabis Radio. The podcast was formatted as a travelogue, covering live cannabis events with a discussion on current cannabis topics and trends. Bealum was a contributor for the Sacramento News & Review, writing the Ask420 column on marijuana and its politics, as well as a host on the cannabis trivia app Daily Bonfire.

Ngaio was born in San Francisco to hippie parents, who were active in their community as Black Panthers. As an entertainer and activist, Bealum guests on television and cultural commentary podcasts, notably on topics concerning the cannabis industry. From new products and technology, as well as cannabis activism and legalization. Bealum is a frequent guest on Getting Doug With High hosted by fellow comedian Doug Benson, regularly hosts High Times events, and participates in the annual International Cannabis Business Conference. His debut comedy album "Weed and Sex" was released in 2012. Bealum was also a member of the award winning hip hop band Most Chill Slackmob (vocals, percussion), and 1994 People's Choice Award winner of the International Jugglers Association Fest.

Bealum featured on a line of cannabis "pre-rolls" through Mothership Farms, where he showcased unique Cannabis strains through his close relationship with growers. The first release was Tahoe Nebula. He also has a featured strain through Natural Cannabis' "High Life Celebrities" line.

Podcasts
Chopping it Up (2022)
Rollin with Ngaio (2016)

Discography
Weedier and Sexier (2019) 800 Pound Gorilla Records
420 Friendly Comedy Special (2014) Apprehensive Films- Compilation DVD/Blu-ray 
Weed and Sex (2012) Dogpatch Media 
A Stash of Stand-Up Comedy: Pot's Greatest Hits (2005) Laughter Heals- Compilation

Credits
 Cooking on High (2018)
 Laughs (2014)
 Hey Monster, Hands Off My City (2014)
 Sarah Silverman Program (2007–2008)
 Comics Unleashed with Bryon Allen (2005)
 It Burns When I Laugh (2003)
 Nine Months (1995)
 Comic Justice (1993)
 Cheesehead Show KDBK Radio (1993)

References

External links
 
 
Chopping it Up with Ngaio Bealum
Rollin with Ngaio on Cannabis Radio
Most Chill Slack Mob
Most Chill Slack Mob
Ngaio Bealum: Stand-up comic, Cannabis activist, Pot-repreneur

1968 births
Living people
American infotainers
American podcasters
American stand-up comedians
Male actors from San Francisco
Comedians from California
21st-century American comedians
American cannabis activists